Yuri Alekseyevich Getikov (born 19 June 1971) is a Russian football coach and a former player.

Honours
Tavriya Simferopol
Ukrainian Premier League: 1992

External links
 
 

1971 births
Sportspeople from Gomel Region
Living people
Belarusian emigrants to Russia
FC Irtysh Omsk players
Soviet footballers
SC Tavriya Simferopol players
Russian footballers
Russian expatriate footballers
Expatriate footballers in Ukraine
Russian expatriate sportspeople in Ukraine
Ukrainian Premier League players
FC Baltika Kaliningrad players
FC Temp Shepetivka players
PFC Krylia Sovetov Samara players
Russian Premier League players
FC Dynamo Stavropol players
Russian football managers
Association football defenders
Crimean Premier League managers
FC Novokuznetsk players